Zoomer is the second studio album by German electronic music artist Schneider TM. It was released on 20 August 2002 in the United States by Mute Records and on 2 September 2002 by City Slang.

Track listing
All lyrics are written by Dirk Dresselhaus, except where noted; all music is composed by Dresselhaus.

 "Reality Check" – 4:23
 "Frogtoise" – 6:59
 "Abyss" – 6:28
 "DJ Guy?" – 6:47
 "Turn On" (lyrics by Max Turner) – 5:49
 "Hunger" – 5:07
 "999" – 5:16
 "Cuba TM" – 4:55

Personnel
Credits are adapted from the album's liner notes.

 Dirk Dresselhaus – production, mixing (tracks 3, 6, 7), booklet illustrations
 Cathi Aglibut – viola on "Cuba TM"
 Vredeber Albrecht – electric piano on "Cuba TM"
 D. D. Allin – cover design
 Matthias Arfmann – mixing (tracks 1, 2, 4, 5, 8)
 Elger Emig – cover design
 Bo Kondren – mastering
 Paul Niehaus – slide guitar on "Cuba TM"
 Max Turner – vocals on "Turn On"
 Christopher Uhe – bass on "999"
 Tina Winkhaus – photography

References

External links
 

2002 albums
Schneider TM albums
City Slang albums
Mute Records albums